Tamsin O'Connell is an archaeological scientist based at the University of Cambridge. Her work has pioneered the use of isotope analysis in archaeology, specifically diet and climate in human and animal tissues.

Education 
O'Connell studied Chemistry at the University of Oxford. She began to work with Robert Hedges at the Research Laboratory for Archaeology and the History of Art in Oxford initially during her undergraduate dissertation followed by a DPhil funded by SERC/NERC. Her thesis was titled 'The isotopic relationship between diet and body proteins : implications for the study of diet in archaeology', completed in 1996.

Career 
O'Connell held a Wellcome Trust Post-doctoral Fellowship, and then two post-doctoral positions at the RLAHA. She joined the University of Cambridge in 2004, with a Wellcome Trust University Award, to set up an isotope and palaeodiet laboratory, now called the Dorothy Garrod Laboratory.

In 2019 she was appointed as a Reader in Isotopic Ecology. O'Connell is a Fellow in Bioarchaeology and Director of Studies in Archaeology at Trinity Hall.

She has supervised Phd students in isotopic archaeology, including Amy Prendergast, Suzanne Pilaar-Birch, and Emma Lightfoot.

Research 
O'Connell has collaborated widely with archaeologists across time periods, including Roman Italy. O'Connell has also worked with ecological and epidemiological case studies.

Selected publications

References 

Year of birth missing (living people)
Living people
British archaeologists
British women archaeologists
Bioarchaeologists
Alumni of the University of Oxford
Academics of the University of Cambridge